Vlatko Paskačić was a 14th-century Serbian feudal lord (sebastokrator) of Slavište region around Kriva Palanka under the Mrnjavčevići (1366-1395), in modern Republic of Macedonia.

His father was Paskač, a noble during the time of Stefan Dušan, his mother was Ozra.

He ruled the Slavište župa stretching from Vranje in Serbia to Kriva Palanka in Macedonia. He and his father founded the Orthodox Christian Psača Monastery and donated it to Mount Athos.

He held the office of late Dejan Dragaš after his death, as Jovan Dragaš was still young.

He married Vladislava and had 3 children:
Stefan Vlatković
Uroš Vlatković
Uglješa Vlatković

References

Elena. L'ultima imperatrice bizantina-Luka Petanović (Italian)
Il medioevo serbo-Sima M. Ćirković (Italian)

14th-century Serbian nobility
Medieval Macedonia
Sebastokrators
Medieval Serbian magnates